Outing, as a verb, is the act of publicly disclosing activities or relationships without the consent of the persons involved. This may include doxing.

Outing, as a noun, is a trip or foray, usually into a new or unknown area, often for recreational or educational purposes.

Arts, entertainment, and media

Books
 Outing (magazine), an 1882 to 1923 American sports magazine
"The Outing" (short story), a 1965 short story by James Baldwin

Film 
 A School Outing, a 1983 Italian drama film
 The Outing (film), a 1987 horror film
 The Outing, an alternative title for Scream (1981 film)

Other arts, entertainment, and media
 "The Outing" (Seinfeld), a 1993 episode of Seinfeld

Geography
 Outing, Minnesota

See also
 Down and Outing, a 1961 Tom and Jerry cartoon
 "The Jolly Boys' Outing", a 1989 Christmas special of the BBC sit-com Only Fools and Horses